Julie Menghini (born April 18, 1964) is a former Democratic House Minority Whip of the Kansas House of Representatives, who represented the 3rd district from 2005 to 2011, and again from 2013-2015. She served on the Joint Committee on Kansas Security, Elections and Transportation Committees as well as the House Taxation Committee, where she was the ranking minority member. Menghini ran for re-election in 2010, but was defeated by Republican Terry Calloway by a margin of less than 200 votes.

Menghini serves as a board member of Elm Acres Youth and Family Services, and a member of the PTO, Business Education Alliance committee for the Pittsburg Area Chamber of Commerce and USD 250.  She also serves on the board of directors for the Alliance for Technology Commercialization.

She lives in Pittsburg and is married to Henry Menghini.  They have three children - Aria, Connor, and Dante.

References

External links
 Official campaign website
 Kansas Legislature - Julie Menghini
 Project Vote Smart profile
 Kansas Votes profile
 State Surge - Legislative and voting track record
 Follow the Money campaign contributions:
 2004, 2006, 2008

Democratic Party members of the Kansas House of Representatives
Living people
People from Pittsburg, Kansas
1964 births
Women state legislators in Kansas
21st-century American women politicians
21st-century American politicians
Pittsburg State University alumni
University of Kansas alumni